Club de Futbol Reus Deportiu B was a Spanish football team based in Cambrils, Tarragona in the autonomous community of Catalonia. Founded in 1960 as Futbol Club Cambrils, it was the reserve team of CF Reus Deportiu. They played their home games at Camp Municipal de Cambrils.

History
Founded in 1960 as FC Cambrils, the club was incorporated in CF Reus Deportiu's structure in 2016, being renamed to CF Reus Deportiu B. In their first season after the change, the club achieved promotion to Tercera División after finishing second in the Primera Catalana.

On 20 October 2020, after the first team's dissolution, Reus B was also dissolved.

Club background
Futbol Club Cambrils (1960–2016)
Club de Futbol Reus Deportiu B (2016–2019)

Season to season
 As FC Cambrils

 As CF Reus Deportiu B

 2 seasons in Tercera División

See also
:Category:CF Reus Deportiu B players

References

External links
Official website 

CF Reus Deportiu
Spanish reserve football teams
Football clubs in Catalonia
Association football clubs established in 1960
1960 establishments in Spain
Association football clubs disestablished in 2020
2020 disestablishments in Spain
Sport in Reus